El Globo was a Spanish daily newspaper which was in circulation between 1875 and 1932 in Madrid, Spain. Its subtitle was diario ilustrado (Spanish: Illustrated Daily). It was among the influential publications of the period during which it existed.

History and profile
El Globo was launched by Emilio Castelar, a Spanish politician, in Madrid in 1875, and its first issue appeared on 25 March 1875. Its political stance was the moderate possibilist republican. In 1885 another Spanish politician Eleuterio Maisonnave acquired the paper. Next owner was Álvaro de Figueroa who bought El Globo in 1896, changing its political stance to liberal monarchism. The paper was sold to the Catalan deputy Emilio Ríus y Peniquet in 1902. The last owner was Magdaleno de Castro. 

In the period 1897–1898 El Globo published a literary supplement entitled Plana del Lunes. Due to lower circulation levels the frequency of the paper was switched from daily to twice per week in 1923. Under the ownership of Magdaleno de Castro it was published on a weekly basis. The final issue of El Globo was published on 31 May 1932.

Contributors and circulation
The paper was directed by Joaquín Martín de Olías from 1877. From 1890 to 1896 it was directed by Alfredo Vicenti Rey. Its major contributors included Francisco Navarro Ledesma, Andrés Ovejero, Baldomero Argente, Manuel Castro Tiedra and Manuel Tercero.  

El Globo sold 25,000 copies in 1880. Its circulation was 8,000 copies in 1913 which dropped to 2,000 copies in 1920.

References

External links

1875 establishments in Spain
1932 disestablishments in Spain
Daily newspapers published in Spain
Defunct newspapers published in Spain
Newspapers published in Madrid
Newspapers established in 1875
Publications disestablished in 1932
Spanish-language newspapers
Weekly newspapers published in Spain
Defunct weekly newspapers